Secret was a chocolate bar that was manufactured by Rowntree Mackintosh during the 1980s and the 1990s that was popular in the UK. It consisted of a bird's nest-styled chocolate coating with a creamy mousse centre similar to the filling of a Walnut Whip. It was packaged in a gold-coloured wrapper with the product's name printed on it in purple and white.

A television advert for the product, first shown in 1990, and set in a 1940s mystery film style featured an elegant lady riding a train when a man rushes into her cabin and hands her a Secret bar saying, "guard this with your life". He then runs off to divert the two mysterious men who've been following him, but while he's away, the woman eats the secret bar because she couldn't resist such a delicious temptation. When the man returns to retrieve it, it's gone, because she had eaten it. At the end of the advert the words accompanied by a voice-over says, "You can't trust anyone to keep a Secret." The product was discontinued a couple of years later, due to high production costs and low volume of sales.

In more recent years there have been a number of petitions, on websites such as Facebook, asking Nestlé to relaunch the Secret bar. This has not happened as yet, but similar petitions held for the Cadbury's Wispa chocolate bar, which was discontinued in 2003, eventually led to its relaunch on October 8, 2007.

References

Chocolate bars
Nestlé brands